Serhiy Viktorovych Malyi (born 5 June 1990) is a professional footballer who plays as a defender for Tobol. Born in Ukraine, he represents the Kazakhstan national team.

Career
Malyi is the product of the Luhansk's sportive system. His first coach was Serhiy Kalitvintsev.

On 22 August 2011 Malyi scored a tying goal for Ukraine in the game against Thailand at the 2011 Summer Universiade in China.

During the winter of 2013 Malyi accepted the citizenship of Kazakhstan.

On 28 June 2016, Malyi moved to FC Astana.

On 11 January 2017, Malyi signed a one-year loan deal with FC Tobol. After playing for FC Ordabasy during the 2019 season, Malyi returned to Astana in January 2020. On 2 July 2020, Astana announced that Malyi had left the club after the expiration of his contract.

Career statistics

Club

International

References

External links 

1990 births
Living people
Footballers from Luhansk
Ukrainian emigrants to Kazakhstan
Naturalised citizens of Kazakhstan
Kazakhstani footballers
Ukrainian footballers
Ukraine student international footballers
Kazakhstan international footballers
FC Komunalnyk Luhansk players
FC Zorya Luhansk players
FC Arsenal-Kyivshchyna Bila Tserkva players
FC Shakhter Karagandy players
FC Ordabasy players
FC Irtysh Pavlodar players
FC Astana players
Ukrainian Premier League players
Kazakhstan Premier League players
Association football defenders
Ukrainian Second League players